The 2020 Copa Libertadores final stages were played from 24 November 2020 to 30 January 2021. A total of 16 teams competed in the final stages to decide the champions of the 2020 Copa Libertadores, with the final played in Rio de Janeiro, Brazil at the Maracanã Stadium.

The final stages had been originally scheduled to be played from 21 July to 21 November 2020, but were postponed due to the COVID-19 pandemic.

Qualified teams
The winners and runners-up of each of the eight groups in the group stage advanced to the round of 16.

Seeding

Starting from the round of 16, the teams were seeded according to their results in the group stage, with the group winners (Pot 1) seeded 1–8, and the group runners-up (Pot 2) seeded 9–16.

Format

Starting from the round of 16, the teams played a single-elimination tournament with the following rules:
In the round of 16, quarter-finals and semi-finals, each tie was played on a home-and-away two-legged basis, with the higher-seeded team hosting the second leg (Regulations Article 2.2.3.2). If tied on aggregate, the away goals rule was used. If still tied, extra time was not played, and a penalty shoot-out was used to determine the winners (Regulations Article 2.4.3).
The final was played as a single match at a venue pre-selected by the CONMEBOL, with the higher-seeded team designated as the "home" team for administrative purposes (Regulations Article 2.2.3.5). If tied after regulation, 30 minutes of extra time would be played. If still tied after extra time, a penalty shoot-out would be used to determine the winners (Regulations Article 2.4.4).

Draw

The draw for the round of 16 was held on 23 October 2020, 12:00 PYT (UTC−3). For the round of 16, the 16 teams were drawn into eight ties (A–H) between a group winner (Pot 1) and a group runner-up (Pot 2), with the group winners hosting the second leg. Teams from the same association or the same group could be drawn into the same tie (Regulations Article 2.2.3.2).

Bracket
The bracket starting from the round of 16 was determined as follows:

The bracket was decided based on the round of 16 draw, which was held on 23 October 2020.

Round of 16
The first legs were played on 24–26 November and 2 December, and the second legs were played on 1–3 and 9 December 2020.

|}

Match A

Grêmio won 4–0 on aggregate and advanced to the quarter-finals (Match S1).

Match B

Tied 0–0 on aggregate, Nacional won on penalties and advanced to the quarter-finals (Match S2).

Match C

Palmeiras won 8–1 on aggregate and advanced to the quarter-finals (Match S3).

Match D

Tied 1–1 on aggregate, Boca Juniors won on penalties and advanced to the quarter-finals (Match S4).

Match E

Tied 2–2 on aggregate, Racing won on penalties and advanced to the quarter-finals (Match S4).

Match F

Libertad won 5–1 on aggregate and advanced to the quarter-finals (Match S3).

Match G

River Plate won 2–1 on aggregate and advanced to the quarter-finals (Match S2).

Match H

Tied 2–2 on aggregate, Santos won on away goals and advanced to the quarter-finals (Match S1).

Quarter-finals
The first legs were played on 8–10 and 16 December, and the second legs were played on 15–17 and 23 December 2020.

|}

Match S1

Santos won 5–2 on aggregate and advanced to the semi-finals (Match F1).

Match S2

River Plate won 8–2 on aggregate and advanced to the semi-finals (Match F2).

Match S3

Palmeiras won 4–1 on aggregate and advanced to the semi-finals (Match F2).

Match S4

Boca Juniors won 2–1 on aggregate and advanced to the semi-finals (Match F1).

Semi-finals
The first legs were played on 5 and 6 January 2021, and the second legs were played on 12 and 13 January 2021.

|}

Match F1

Santos won 3–0 on aggregate and advanced to the final.

Match F2

Palmeiras won 3–2 on aggregate and advanced to the final.

Final

The final was played on 30 January 2021 at the Maracanã in Rio de Janeiro.

Notes

References

External links
CONMEBOL Libertadores 2020, CONMEBOL.com

3
November 2020 sports events in South America
December 2020 sports events in South America
January 2021 sports events in South America